Lao Shaopei (born 19 April 1962) is a Chinese fencer. He competed in the foil events at the 1988 and 1992 Summer Olympics.

References

External links
 

1962 births
Living people
Chinese male foil fencers
Olympic fencers of China
Fencers at the 1988 Summer Olympics
Fencers at the 1992 Summer Olympics
Asian Games medalists in fencing
Fencers at the 1986 Asian Games
Fencers at the 1990 Asian Games
Asian Games gold medalists for China
Asian Games silver medalists for China
Asian Games bronze medalists for China
Medalists at the 1986 Asian Games
Medalists at the 1990 Asian Games
20th-century Chinese people
21st-century Chinese people